Leopold is the modern form of the Germanic name  Luitbald, composed of two stems, common to Germanic names. The first part is related to Old High German liut meaning "people", the second part bald or balt is of Germanic origin and means "brave".  The name is not related to the names Leon and Leonard which mean lion. The name gradually spread across Western Europe and during the 16th century it became popular in the southern Holy Roman Empire, due to the influence of the Margraves of Austria from the Babenberg dynasty.

Over a dozen Austrian rulers took the name, as did nearly a dozen from other European realms.



Artists 
 Leopold Blaschka (1822–1895), German glass artist
 Leopold Scholz (1877–1946), American sculptor 
 Léopold Zborowski (1889–1932), Polish art dealer

Businessmen 
 Leopold David de Rothschild (1927–2012), British banker
 Leopold de Rothschild (1845–1917), British banker
 Léopold Louis-Dreyfus (1833–1915), French investor and businessman

Literary figures 
 Leopold Andrian (1875−1951), Austrian author, dramatist and diplomat
 Leopold Friedrich Günther von Goeckingk (1748–1828), German lyric poet, journalist, and Prussian official
 Leopold Engel (1858–1931), German writer and occultist
 Leopold Schefer (1784–1862), German poet, novelist, and composer
 Leopold Schwarzschild (1891–1950), German author
 Leopold Staff (1878–1957), Polish poet
 Leopold Suhodolčan (1928–1980), Slovene writer
 Leopold Tyrmand (1920–1985), Polish novelist, writer, and editor
 Leopold von Ranke (1795–1886), German historian and a founder of modern source-based history
 Leopold von Sacher-Masoch (1836–1895), Austrian writer and journalist
 Leopold Zunz (1794–1886), founder of academic Judaic Studies

Mathematicians  
 Leopold Gegenbauer (1849–1903), Austrian mathematician 
 Leopold Kronecker (1823–1891), German mathematician
 Leopold Löwenheim (1878–1957), German mathematician
 Leopold Vietoris (1891–2002), Austrian mathematician

Military 
 Leopold von Rauch (1787–1860), major general in the Prussian Army

Movie industry 
 Leopold Biberti (1894–1969), Swiss actor
 Leopold Jessner (1878–1945), German director
 Leopold Kramer (1869–1942), Austrian stage and film actor
 Leopold Lindtberg (1902–1984), Austrian Swiss film and theatre director

Musicians 
 Leopold Auer (1845–1930), Hungarian conductor and composer
 Leopold Damrosch (1832–1885), German American conductor and composer
 Leopold Godowsky (1870–1938), American pianist and composer
 Leopold Godowsky Jr. (1900–1983), American violinist and chemist
 Leopold Hager (born 1935), Austrian conductor 
 Leopold Hofmann (1738–1793), Austrian composer
 Leopold Koželuch (1747–1818), Czech composer and music teacher
 Leopold Mannes (1899–1964), American musician 
 Leopold Mozart (1719–1787), German conductor and composer
 Leopold Ross, English musician 
 Léopold Simoneau (1916–2006), French-Canadian lyric tenor
 Leopold Spinner (1906–1980), Austrian British composer and editor
 Leopold Stokowski (1882–1977), British conductor
 Leopold Wlach (1902–1956), Austrian clarinetist

Other 
 Léopold Dion (1920-1972), Canadian sex offender and serial killer
 Leopold Engleitner (1905–2013), Austrian conscientious objector and concentration camp survivor 
 Leopold Halliday Savile (1870–1953), Scottish civil engineer
 Leopold Pokagon (c. 1775–1841), Potawatomi chief
 Leopold von Sonnleithner (1797–1873), Austrian lawyer

Philosophical figures 
 Leopold Kohr (1909–1994), Austrian American economist, jurist and political scientist
 Leopold von Henning (1791–1866), German philosopher

Political figures 
 Leopold Berchtold (1863–1942), Austro-Hungarian politician, diplomat and statesman
 Léopold Biha (1919–2003), Burundian prime minister 
 Leopold Caspari (1830–1915), Louisiana politician 
 Leopold Hasner von Artha (1818–1891), Austrian civil servant and statesman
 Léopold Sédar Senghor (1906–2001), first president of Senegal
 Leopold Seneviratne, Sri Lankan civil servant
 Leopold Trepper (1904–1982), Polish Communist and career Soviet agent
 Leopold von Hoesch (1881–1936), career German diplomat

Religious figures 
 Saint Leopold (disambiguation)

Royalty 
 King Leopold (disambiguation)
 Leopold I (disambiguation)
 Leopold II (disambiguation)
 Leopold III (disambiguation)
 Leopold IV (disambiguation)
 Leopold IV (disambiguation)
 Leopold V (disambiguation)
 Leopold VI, Duke of Austria (1176–1230)
 Leopold, Duke of Lorraine (1679 –1729)
 Leopold of Styria (died 1129)
 Prince Leopold (disambiguation)

Scientists 
 Leopold Auenbrugger (1722–1809), Austrian physician 
 Leopold B. Felsen (1924–2005), American physicist 
 Léopold Eyharts (born 1957), French astronaut
 Leopold Gmelin (1788–1853), German chemist
 Leopold Horner (1911–2005), German chemist
 Leopold Infeld (1898–1968), Polish physicist 
 Leopold Melichar (1856–1924), Czech entomologist and physician
 Leopold Ritter von Dittel (1815–1898), Austrian urologist 
 Leopold Ružička (1887–1976), Croatian-Swiss scientist 
 Leopold Saverio Vaccaro, American surgeon and scientist 
 Leopold Schenk (1840–1902), Austrian embryologist
 Leopold von Schrenck (1826–1894), Russian zoologist, geographer and ethnographer

Sportsmen 
 Léopold Cavalière (born 1996), French basketball player
 Léopold Gernaey (1927–2005), Belgian goalkeeper

See also
 Leopold (surname)
 Leopold (disambiguation)

References

English masculine given names
German masculine given names
Dutch masculine given names
Polish masculine given names
Slovene masculine given names